John Ashton MacKenzie (September 17, 1917 – January 1, 2010) was a Virginia lawyer, Coast Guard officer and politician who became United States district judge of the United States District Court for the Eastern District of Virginia.

Early life and education
Born in Portsmouth, Virginia, to Henry William MacKenzie and his wife, the former Clare Maupin Ashton, young MacKenzie was educated in the local public schools (his maternal great-grandfather having been the city's first public school superintendent after the American Civil War), including the then-segregated Woodrow Wilson High School. He had an elder brother, Henry, and two sisters. Following his brother's example, he traveled to Lexington, Virginia for college and law school, receiving a Bachelor of Laws from Washington and Lee University School of Law in 1939.

Legal career
Following admission to the Virginia bar, MacKenzie had a private legal practice in Portsmouth from 1939 to 1967. He also served as an officer in the United States Coast Guard during World War II, from 1941 to 1946. He was an associate judge of the Municipal Court of Portsmouth from 1952 to 1962, during the last several years of which his brother was an associate judge of the Circuit Court for Portsmouth as well as Princess Anne and Isle of Wight counties.

Portsmouth voters elected and re-elected MacKenzie to represent them in the Virginia House of Delegates (part-time) from 1954 to 1958. MacKenzie also served as president of the Portsmouth Assembly from 1950 to 1955, and as president of the Portsmouth Chamber of Commerce in 1967. In 1968, the local Moose lodge selected him as Portsmouth's "First Citizen" for his accomplishments on behalf of the city.

Federal judicial service

On July 17, 1967, President Lyndon B. Johnson nominated MacKenzie to a new seat on the United States District Court for the Eastern District of Virginia created by 80 Stat. 75. He was confirmed by the United States Senate on August 18, 1967, and received his commission on August 25, 1967. He served three decades, including as Chief Judge from 1979 to 1985. MacKenzie assumed senior status on November 30, 1985, serving in that capacity until his retirement from the bench, on January 30, 1998. MacKenzie died on January 1, 2010, in Portsmouth.

Personal life
MacKenzie married Elizabeth Nash during World War II, and during their 61-year marriage they raised a son and daughter. Mackenzie served as chairman of the Eastern Virginia Council of Boy Scouts in 1972-1972, and was also active in Trinity Episcopal Church, including service on the vestry.

References

Sources
 

1917 births
2010 deaths
Judges of the United States District Court for the Eastern District of Virginia
United States district court judges appointed by Lyndon B. Johnson
20th-century American judges
Washington and Lee University School of Law alumni
United States Coast Guard officers
United States Coast Guard personnel of World War II